The 2019–20 Texas A&M Aggies women's basketball team represents Texas A&M University in the 2019–20 NCAA Division I women's basketball season. The team's head coach is Gary Blair, who enters his seventeenth season at Texas A&M. The team plays their home games at the Reed Arena in College Station, Texas and in its eighth season as a member of the Southeastern Conference.

Previous season
The Aggies finished the 2018–19 season with a record of 26-8 (12-4 SEC). They lost the SEC women's tournament to Arkansas. They received an at-large bid to the NCAA women's tournament and defeated Wright State and Marquette in the first and second rounds, before losing to Notre Dame in the Sweet Sixteen for the second-straight year.

Roster

Rankings

^Coaches' Poll did not release a second poll at the same time as the AP.

Schedule

|-
!colspan=6 style=| Exhibition

|-
!colspan=6 style=| Non-conference season

|-
!colspan=6 style=| SEC regular season

|-
!colspan=6 style=| SEC Tournament

References

Texas A&M Aggies women's basketball seasons
Texas AandM
Texas AandM Aggies women's basketball
Texas AandM Aggies women's basketball